Beverley Anne Farmer (also known as B. Christou) (7 February 1941 – 16 April 2018) was an Australian novelist and short story writer.

Personal life
Beverley Farmer was born in Melbourne. She was educated at Mac.Robertson Girls' High School and at the University of Melbourne, where she graduated with a BA in 1960.

She worked in various jobs, mainly secondary-school teaching and running a restaurant, before becoming a professional writer. She was married to a Greek migrant, Christos Talihmanidis, for thirteen years 1965-78, three of them spent in Greece. They returned to Australia for their son to be born in 1972 and they were subsequently divorced.

Farmer's autobiographical novella Alone (1980) reworked a story which had appeared in Westerly (1968). It was published by the firm of Sisters and "gives a sensitive portrayal of the breakup of a lesbian relationship." While she is best known for her fiction, Farmer also wrote essays, poetry, reviews and criticism. Her writing appeared in several magazines, journals and newspapers, including Overland, Westerly, Meanjin, Island Magazine, and The Bulletin.

Loss features as a central theme in Farmer's stories. She described it as the "touchstone" of her work. The "experience of being foreign" was also favoured. Several stories in her 1985 book Home Time show growing awareness of the relation between life and fiction, writers and readers. She was an admirer of her fellow Australian novelist Marjorie Barnard.

Beverley Farmer died on 16 April 2018, aged 77.

Awards and nominations
1984 – New South Wales Premier's Literary Awards, Christina Stead Prize for Fiction for Milk
1996 – The House in the Light was shortlisted for the Miles Franklin Award
2009 – Patrick White Award
2018 – This Water was long-listed for The Stella Prize

Selected works

Short story anthologies
  Snake (1982)
  Milk (1983)
  Home Time (1985)
  Collected Stories (1987)
 This Water: Five Tales (2017)

Novellas

  Alone (1980)
  The Seal Woman (1992)
  The House in the Light (1995)

Other

  A Body of Water: A Year's Notebook (1990)
  The Bone House (2005)

References

==Further reading==
  Jacobs, Lyn. Against The Grain: Beverley Farmer's Writing. St. Lucia: University of Queensland Press, 2001. Critical Study in UQP Studies in Australian Literature, which includes biographical material, analysis of novels, short stories and poetry

1941 births
2018 deaths
Australian women novelists
Australian women short story writers
Writers from Melbourne
Patrick White Award winners
20th-century Australian novelists
20th-century Australian women writers
20th-century Australian short story writers
University of Melbourne alumni
People educated at Mac.Robertson Girls' High School